The Moro Bay ferry is a historic ferry site at Moro Bay State Park in southwestern Bradley County, Arkansas.  A ferry operated across the Ouachita River at this site from 1828 until 1948, and then again from 1965 to 1992, providing a major crossing point of the river in the immediate region.  The towboat and barge used by the 1965-1992 ferry service are now set up as a display in the state park, with historically appropriate signage to its ferry slip.  Because the area is prone to flooding, the boats are installed in a way that they will float when flooded.  The boats were built in 1948 by the Barbour Metal Boat Works of St. Louis, and were probably the last ferry boats built for public service in the state.

The boats were listed on the National Register of Historic Places in 2018.

See also
National Register of Historic Places listings in Bradley County, Arkansas
Dixie (sternwheeler): Indiana ship also made by the Barbour Metal Boat Works

References

Towboats
Tourist attractions in Arkansas
Ships on the National Register of Historic Places in Arkansas
National Register of Historic Places in Bradley County, Arkansas
Museum ships in Arkansas
Transportation in Bradley County, Arkansas
Ships built in St. Louis
Ouachita River
Barges of the United States
1965 establishments in Arkansas
1828 establishments in Arkansas Territory
1992 disestablishments in Arkansas
1948 disestablishments in Arkansas